The RAF Third Tactical Air Force (Third TAF), which was formed in South Asia in December 1943, was one of three tactical air forces formed by the Royal Air Force (RAF) during the Second World War. It was made up of squadrons and personnel from the RAF, Indian Air Force (IAF) and the air forces of other Commonwealth countries.  Third TAF was formed shortly after the establishment of South East Asia Command to provide close air support to the Fourteenth Army.

It was first formed on 19 December 1943 designated the Tactical Air Force (Burma) and renamed as the Third TAF on 28 December 1943. Along with parts of the USAAF Tenth Air Force, it was subordinate to Joint Allied Eastern Air Command which was also formed in December 1943.

As the Air Force was formed, it was felt that at last British forces could go over to the offensive against the Japanese in the Burma Campaign.  A start was made towards establishing a general offensive in Arakan in early 1943, but this was forestalled by a Japanese offensive. The Japanese were decisively beaten, but they shifted the focus of their attack to central Burma. Third TAF gave sterling service to Fourteenth Army during the Battle of Kohima and the Battle of Imphal, strafing and bombing the besieging Japanese troops, often at very low level.

After the defeat of the Japanese by IV Corps and XXXIII Corps in Assam, the monsoon intervened before many counterattacks could take place. After the enforced period of reduced operations, the Third TAF supported the advance of Fourteenth Army against the Japanese forces. However, command arrangement changes at the end of 1944 cutting short the life of the Third TAF. It was redesignated HQ RAF Bengal and Burma on 4 December 1944.

The Third TAF had two commanders, Air Marshal John Baldwin up until 15 August 1944, and then Air Marshal Sir Alec Coryton.

Composition

The Third TAF comprised the following Groups:
 No. 221 Group RAF supporting the IV Corps.
 During the battle of Imphal there were seldom more than seven squadrons engaged at one time but over the three months' of the siege altogether 21 squadrons took part: including three from the Indian Air Force (Nos. 1, 2, 7 and 9). The RAF squadrons were Nos. 5, 11, 20, 28, 34, 42, 60, 81, 82, 84, 110, 113, 123, 136, 152, 176, 607 and 615.
 No. 222 Group RAF
 No 222 (General Reconnaissance) Group was based in Ceylon. The Group role was, amongst others, reconnaissance over the Bay of Bengal. The RAF squadrons were at one time Nos. 8, 17, 22, 81, 89, 132, 135, 160, 191, 203, 205, 212, 217, 230, 240, 273, 292, 321 and 413.
 No. 223 Group RAF 151 Squadron (formerly 151 OTU)
 No. 224 Group RAF (commanding officer Air Commodore Alexander Gray) supporting the Indian XV Corps. In the 1943–44 campaigning season, this Group comprised:
 Three RAF fighter squadrons equipped with Spitfires (this campaign marked the first time Spitfires were being used in South-East Asia)
 Six fighter-bomber squadrons with Hurricanes (mainly Mk.IIc variants) (Includes the No. 3 Squadron and No. 4 Squadron IAF equipped with the Hurricane Mk.IIc)
 A single tactical reconnaissance squadron No. 6 Squadron IAF equipped with the Hurricane Mk.IIb
 Two light bomber squadrons (one of which was No. 8 Squadron IAF commanded by Squadron-Leader Niranjan Prasa), equipped with Vultee Vengeances.
 No. 226 Group RAF
 226 group was one of the fighter groups based in Singapore. After the fall of Singapore the number of the group was transferred to the maintenance unit (No. 1301 MU RAF) of the tactical air force.
 No. 227 Group RAF
 227 group, based in Bombay, was the RAF training group based in India for the training of Indian pilots.
 No. 229 Group RAF
 229 Group was the transport part of the Tactical air force. The RAF squadrons were at one time Nos. 31, 52, 62, 96, 117, 194, 216, 232, 238, 267, 353, 435, 436, 668, 669, 670, 671 and 673.
 No. 231 Group RAF
 The role of the group was to provide heavy bombers for the campaign in Burma. The RAF bomber squadrons were at one time Nos. 99, 159, 200, 215, 355, 356, 357 and 358.

Squadrons

A Third TAF Communications Squadron was established on 28 December 1943, but disestablished on 4 December 1944 at RAF Comilla.

Postwar in Burma 
 HQ RAF Bengal and Burma was formed on 4 December 1944 by renaming the 3rd Tactical Air Force, still under Air Marshal Sir Alec Coryton.
 HQ RAF Bengal and Burma was renamed HQ RAF Burma on 27 February 1945.
 Renamed Air Headquarters Burma on 1 June 1945. Air Marshal Sir Hugh Saunders became Air Marshal Commanding from 1 August 1945. 

Burma was relatively straightforward to deal with, although more complicated than Siam. Much of the colony had been conquered several months before the war ended, in the big British offensive of summer 1945. That gave Air Command, South East Asia, crucial breathing space to start getting the colony back on its feet before the massive increase in occupation duties postwar occurred. At the end of the war, it had 28 squadrons under its control. This quickly reduced as the demobilisation really kicked in. Again, the transport squadrons saw the largest amount of work, evacuating prisoners of war and internees and supplying garrisons and the civilian population. Second to the transport squadrons in workload were the photo reconnaissance aircraft. The opportunity was taken to complete the process of surveying SE Asia from the air, and using the survey to bring maps up to date. The survey was not completed until August 1947. 

A light transport and liaison squadron, Air Headquarters Burma Communication Squadron, was established on 20 September 1945 at Baigachi, but disbanded within two months, on 14 November 1945 at RAF Mingaladon (now Yangon International Airport), by being downgraded to Air Headquarters Burma Communication Flight RAF.

After the clean-up immediately postwar, came the task of preparing Burma for independence. AHQ Burma moved out of Rangoon to Mingaladon on 1 January 1947. The Burmese Air Force was established on 16 January 1947 with former British aircraft. AHQ Burma was disbanded on 31 December 1947, and three months later Burma became independent.

See also
 RAF First Tactical Air Force
 RAF Second Tactical Air Force
 List of Royal Air Force commands

Notes

References 
 Delve, Ken. The Source Book of the RAF. Shrewsbury, Shropshire, UK: Airlife Publishing Ltd., 1994. .
 Franks, Norman L.R. The Air Battle of Imphal. London: William Kimber, 1985. .

External links 
 No. 211 Squadron RAF
 No. 6 Squadron, Indian Air Force - The First Five Years
 RAF at the Battle of Imphal
 Battle of Britain, 152 (Hyderabad) Fighter Squadron website

Third Tactical Air Force
Military units and formations established in 1943
Military units and formations disestablished in 1944
Military units and formations of the Royal Air Force in World War II
Tactical air forces